Although human settlements around and in the oases of the Sahara have existed for millennia, a relatively small number of explorers have recording traversing the entire desert due to its inhospitable nature and vastness. According to Herodotus, the Nasamones, a nomadic Berber tribe living in what is now Libya, sent five sons of chieftains to explore the desert. Below is a partial list of explorers whose travels across the Sahara are recorded and known in the present day.

Notable explorers 

 Herodotus born c. 484 BC. Herodotus in his Histories mentions for example the Garamantes of Libya.
 Al Idrisi (1100–1166) born in Ceuta. Wrote a medieval geography The Book of Roger. Created a map of the world in 70 sections.
 Ibn Battuta (1304–1369) [1349-53]. Born at Tangier in 1304, Battuta was to travel the world including Jordan, Arabia, Iraq, Iran, Somalia, Tanzania, Crimea, Balkans, Russia, Central Asia, India, Maldives, Sri Lanka, Assam, Bengal, Malaya, Indonesia, China, Spain and the West African states. Wrote The Travels of Ibn Battuta.
 Leo Africanus (1485–1554) born in Granada and died in Tunis. Educated in Fez, he travelled widely in Africa. Has a wonderful description of Timbuktu. Wrote A Geographical Historie of Africa containing much information on things like Timbuktu.
 Major Daniel Houghton (1740–1791) [1790-91]. He was commissioned by The African Association to find Timbuktu. He travelled up the Gambia across the Senegal and disappeared around Simbing.
 Mungo Park (1771–1806) [1795-96]. A Scot, commissioned by the African Association to explore the River Niger. Set out from the River Gambia and got to the River Niger. Imprisoned and escaped.
 Friedrich Hornemann (1772–1801) [1798-1800]. From Tripoli to Murzuk in 1799. Then disguised as a Muslim, he travelled with a caravan from Cairo to Siwa and Murzuk then down to Lake Chad and Kano.
 Mungo Park (1771–1806) [1805-06]. Returned to the Niger. Attacked at Bussa and drowned whilst trying to escape.
 Joseph Ritchie (?-1818) & George Lyon (1795–1832) [1818]. Travelled from Tripoli to Murzuk.
 Major Alexander Gordon Laing (1793–1826) [1825-26]. Left Tripoli to explore the Niger. Crossed the Sahara and reached Timbuktu.
 René Caillié (1799–1838) [1827-28]. Left from Sierra Leone for Timbuktu. After a long illness he became the first Frenchman to reach Timbuktu. Returned north via Morocco to Tangier.
 Dixon Denham (1786–1828), Clapperton (1788–1827) & Walter Oudney (1786–1828) {+ Adolf Overweg (1813–1852)} [1822-25]. From Tripoli they became the first Europeans to see Lake Chad. Joined a caravan for Kano, but were prevented from reaching the Niger.
 Hugh Clapperton (1788–1827) & Richard Lander (1804–1834) [1825-27]. Crossed the Niger at Bussa where Clapperton died.
 Richard Lander (1804–1834) & John Lander (1807–1839) [1832-34]. Richard and his brother John sailed down the river to discover the position of the river's mouth.
 John Davidson (1797–1836) [1836]. Attempted to get to Timbuktu but was murdered six weeks out from Morocco.
 James Richardson (?-1851) (with Barth & Overweg) [1845-51]. Travelled from Tripoli to Ghadames then Ghat. In 1850 led an expedition with Barth and Overweg from Tripoli to Lake Chad.
 Heinrich Barth (1821–1865) [1850-55]. With the British expedition above travelled from Tripoli to Lake Chad. Became the leader on the death of Richardson. Continued to Timbuktu and returned via Lake Chad to Tripoli. Published Travels and Discoveries in North and Central Africa 3 Vols. 1857.
 Eduard Vogel (1829–1856) [1853-54]. Was sent to Lake Chad to find Barth and Overweg. Continued alone to Zinder and was murdered whilst travelling on the Niger.
 Henri Duveyrier (1840–1892) [1859]. Travelled to El Goléa and then the Tassili. Published The Tuareg of the North.
 Friedrich Gerhard Rohlfs (1831–1896) [1862-65, 1867-81]. Travelled in Morocco. Went from Tafilalt to Ghadames and Tripoli. Finally crossed to Lagos via Murzuk and Lake Chad.
 Alexine Tinne (1839–1869) [1869]. Travelled in Algeria and Tunisia. Set out to cross the Sahara but was murdered after leaving Murzuk.
 Gustav Nachtigal (1834–1885) [1870-74]. Travelled to Fezzan and explored the Tibesti. Crossed the Sahara to Lake Chad and continued to Darfur and Kordofan.
 Paul-Xavier Flatters (1832–1881) [1880-81]. Explored the Sahara north east of the Hoggar mountains, as a colonel in the French army. Expedition wiped out by Tuareg attack. Flatters killed.
 Pere Charles de Foucauld (1858–1916) [1881]. Widely travelled in Morocco. Became a monk living in a hermitage near Tamanrasset.
 Oskar Lenz (1848–1925) [1879-80, 1885-87]. Crossed from Morocco to Timbuktu then went west to the coast at the mouth of the Senegal. Then set out from the mouth of the Congo and arrived at Lake Tanganyika and Lake Nyasa.
 Fernand Foureau (1850–1914) [1898-1900]. Led an expedition accompanied by a military escort led by Major Lamy (?-1900), through the Sahara to Sudan. Continued to Lake Chad.
 Ahmed Hassanein a native to Egypt and a courtier to King Fouad of Egypt who has walked with his Bedouins guards 2200 miles to regions even the guards feared. His expedition on 1923 has corrected Rohlfs map and added to our scientific knowledge of the area as well as discovered the famous rock art of Oweinat. His famous article in the September 1924 issue of National Geographic Magazine had many of the first photos of the people and landscapes.
 Georges Marie Haardt (1884–1932) and Louis Audouin-Dubreuil (1887–1960) [1921-1922; 1924-1925]. The first crossing of the Sahara by motor car (Citroën half-tracked vehicles) was followed by a crossing of the continent ending in Madagascar.
Michael Asher (1953-) and Mariantonietta Peru (1956-) The first crossing of the Sahara from west to east by camel and on foot,  from Chinguetti, Mauritania to Abu Simbel, Egypt a total distance of 4500 miles. (1986–87)
 William George Browne
 Bill Kennedy Shaw
 Charles-Jacques Poncet - Wikidata Q6594681

See also
Desert exploration
European exploration of Africa
Trans-Saharan trade

References

Further reading
Eamonn Gearon. The Sahara: A Cultural History. Signal Books, UK, 2011. Oxford University Press, USA, 2011.
David W. Ball Empires of Sand, Bantam Dell, 1999.  The second half of this novel details the Flatters expedition of 1881 that ended in grisly fashion for the expedition and put an end to French plans for a trans-Saharan railway
Michael Asher Impossible Journey - Two Against The Sahara Penguin Books, UK 1988
Michael Asher Sands of Death - An Epic Tale of Massacre & Survival in the Sahara (on the Flatters expedition) Orion Books,  2007

History of the Sahara
Explorers of Africa
Sahara